Kim Yong-san (October 13, 1922 – July 14, 2011) was a Korean businessman. He was born in Siheung, Gyeonggi province. He is a pioneer in the industrialization of South Korea, specifically the construction business. In 1948 he founded the Kukdong Business Group, one of the largest construction companies in South Korea. His company has built many famous projects which include;  KLCC Building in Kuala Lumpur (currently the third tallest building in the world), Korea World Trade Center, as well as many other projects, both domestically and internationally.

See also
Hyundai
 Economy of South Korea

References

1922 births
2007 deaths
20th-century South Korean businesspeople